BooPac is the seventh solo studio album by American rapper Boosie Badazz. It was released on December 15, 2017, via Trill Entertainment and Atlantic Recording Corporation. It features guest appearances from Yung Bleu, Anthony Hamilton, B. Will, Lee Banks, London Jae. The album peaked at number 38 on the Billboard 200, number 16 on the Top R&B/Hip-Hop Albums and number 12 on the Top Rap Albums in the United States.

Track listing

Charts

References

External link

2017 albums
Lil Boosie albums
Atlantic Records albums